Arpit Vyomahesh Vasavada (born 28 October 1988) is an Indian cricketer who plays for Saurashtra cricket team. He bats left-handed and bowls slow left-arm orthodox spin. He has also represented the West Zone cricket team.

References

External links 
 

1988 births
Living people
Indian cricketers
Saurashtra cricketers
West Zone cricketers